First Order may refer to:

 First order (religious), an institute of consecrated life for men
 First Order of Saint Francis, one such grouping
 First Order (Star Wars), a fictional autocratic military dictatorship
 First-order, a term used in mathematics and logic